Magyar Kupa is the Hungarian cup competition for football clubs.

Magyar Kupa may also refer to:

 Magyar Kupa (men's handball)
 Magyar Kupa (women's handball)
 Magyar Kupa (men's basketball)
 Magyar Kupa (women's basketball)
 Magyar Kupa (men's volleyball)
 Magyar Kupa (women's volleyball)
 Magyar Kupa (men's water polo)
 Magyar Kupa (women's water polo)
 Magyar Kupa (rugby)